Ourense CF is a Galician football club from the city of Ourense. It was founded in 1977 as Ponte Ourense Club de Fútbol, and changed its name in 2014, after the dissolution of CD Ourense, and currently plays in Segunda División RFEF – Group 1, holding home games at Estadio O Couto, which has a capacity of 5,659 spectators.

History 
The 1993-94 season has been the most successful in the history of the club as it achieved its major aim - promotion to the Tercera División thus becoming the only team in the province in this category. The club was founded as Puente Ourense CF before being renamed to Ponte Ourense CF in 1997, and to the current name in 2014. On the 21st of May 2022, Ourense were promoted to Segunda División RFEF after beating Llerenense 4-0 in the promotion playoffs.

Club names 
Puente Ourense Club de Fútbol - (1977–97)
Ponte Ourense Club de Fútbol - (1997–2014)
Ourense Club de Fútbol - (2014–)

Season to season 

1 season in Segunda División RFEF
14 seasons in Tercera División
1 season in Tercera División RFEF

References

External links 
  
 
 Page about the club 

 
Football clubs in Galicia (Spain)
Association football clubs established in 1977
1977 establishments in Spain
Sport in Ourense